Lake Wauburg (sometimes spelled Wauberg) is located just south of Paynes Prairie in central Alachua County, Florida, United States.

The lake is in the Ocala Uplift District, situated between the forested highlands of the Fairfield Hills area and the surrounding dissolution valleys of the Alachua Prairies. The fertile green water supports shad and a deep grass line is good to hold fish. The lake is adjoined to the east by Sawgrass Pond. A marshy area to the northwest is separated from the lake by a topographic high. The north end of the Lake is owned by the University of Florida and is operated as a recreation facility for students and faculty. The southern edge is boarded by Paynes Prairie Preserve State Park, which allows public access to the lake and a boat launch. Outboard motors are prohibited on the lake but trolling motors and paddle boats are permitted.

References

http://myfwc.com/fishing/freshwater/sites-forecast/nc/wauberg/

Wauburg
Wauburg